Santiphap Channgom (born 23 September 1996) is a Thai professional footballer who plays as a right back for Thai League 1 club BG Pathum United and the Thailand national team.

International career
On 12 April 2021, He was named in manager Akira Nishino’s 47-man squad for Thailand’s 2022 World Cup qualification he play the friendly matches against Tajikistan.

Honours
BG Pathum United
 Thai League 1 (1): 2020–21
 Thailand Champions Cup (2): 2021, 2022

References

1996 births
Living people
Santiphap Channgom
Santiphap Channgom
Association football defenders
Santiphap Channgom
Santiphap Channgom
Santiphap Channgom